The Commission for Organizing the Fortified Regions (French: La Commission d'organisation des régions fortifiées (CORF)), is a French military organization created on 30September 1927 by the Minister of War Paul Painlevé to study and carry out border fortification. Its creation was not a spontaneous decision but the result of a long and deep reflection on how best to defend the borders of France.

The acronym CORF also refers to a type of fortification, be it ouvrage (earthwork), bunker, observatory or shelter, whose plans were drawn up by the Commission and form the most powerful part of the Maginot Line.

See also
Maginot Line

References

French Third Republic
Maginot Line
Historic defensive lines
Fortifications
France